Francesca Paci (born 30 April 1971) is an Italian journalist.

Paci was born in Rome in 1971. She graduated with a degree in modern literature and she worked at the Gazzetta di Mantova before she went to work at La Stampa, Turin's online newspaper in 2000. Much of her work in the beginning was focused on immigration and Islam locally before movingh to foreign affairs and the Middle East. Paci went on to become a correspondent for the paper working in Jerusalem and London. She is now based in Rome. In 2007 Paci worked on the La7 television program Nirvana and works with Radio Rai3 File Urbani. Paci also teaches in Rome at the Luiss School of Journalism. Paci has won a number of awards and honours for her work

Awards 
 2005 the Marco Luchetta International Journalist Award
 2007 the Premiolino Giovani 
 2008 Knight Order of Merit of the Italian Republic
 2011 the Golden Doves Award for Peace
 2015 the Maria grazia Cutuli Award
 2018 the Fiuggi-Storia Award - Gian Gaspare Napolitano.

Bibliography
L'Islam sotto casa. Silent integration,  (2004)
Il sonno della ragione,  (2004)
Islam and violence. Italian Muslims speak, (2006)
Where Christians die. From Egypt to Indonesia, travel to the places where Christianity is a persecuted minority,  (2011)
If I close my eyes I die,  (2015)

References and sources

1971 births
Living people
Journalists from Rome
20th-century Italian journalists
20th-century Italian writers
21st-century Italian writers